Wellington West was a parliamentary electorate in the western suburbs of Wellington, New Zealand, from 1938 to 1946. It was represented by two Members of Parliament, including Catherine Stewart, the country's second female MP. It was succeeded by the Karori electorate.

Population centres
The 1931 New Zealand census had been cancelled due to the Great Depression, so the 1937 electoral redistribution had to take ten years of population growth into account. The increasing population imbalance between the North and South Islands had slowed, and only one electorate seat was transferred from south to north. Five electorates were abolished, one former electorate was re-established, and four electorates were created for the first time, including Wellington West.

By area, the Wellington West electorate was mostly made up from what previously belonged to the  electorate. By population, it mostly gained areas from the  electorate. Settlements within the electorate's area were Mākara and Mākara Beach.

History
Wellington West existed from the 1938 election for two parliamentary terms until 1946.

Catherine Stewart was the first representative. She won the election in 1938, when she defeated long-standing MP Robert Wright who had previously represented the Wellington Suburbs electorate. Stewart was the second woman to be elected to Parliament after Elizabeth McCombs. She was defeated in the next by Charles Bowden.

Members of Parliament
Key

Election results

1943 election

1938 election

 
 
 
 
 
 

Table footnotes:

Notes

References

Historical electorates of New Zealand
Politics of the Wellington Region
1938 establishments in New Zealand
1946 disestablishments in New Zealand